Ryan Bezuidenhout (born 26 February 1986) is a Zimbabwean first-class cricketer. He played for the Southern Rocks in the 2013–14 season, and the Mid West Rhinos in 2014–15.

References

External links
 

1986 births
Living people
Zimbabwean cricketers
Southern Rocks cricketers
Mid West Rhinos cricketers
Sportspeople from Harare